Sergei Hohlov-Simson (born 22 April 1972 in Pärnu) is a retired football central defender from Estonia. He last played for FC Levadia Tallinn, where he retired in 2005. He also played as a professional in Israel and Norway.

International career
Hohlov-Simson obtained a total number of 58 caps for the national team during his career, scoring two goals.

References 
 

1972 births
Living people
Sportspeople from Pärnu
Estonian footballers
Estonia international footballers
Estonian expatriate footballers
Association football defenders
FCI Levadia Tallinn players
Hapoel Kfar Saba F.C. players
Hapoel Tayibe F.C. players
Expatriate footballers in Norway
Estonian expatriate sportspeople in Norway
Expatriate footballers in Israel
Estonian expatriate sportspeople in Israel
FC Kuressaare players
Viljandi JK Tulevik players
Meistriliiga players